I See a Darkness is the sixth album by American musician Will Oldham, released on Palace Records on January 19, 1999 as the first album under the name Bonnie "Prince" Billy. The album features appearances from Bob Arellano, Colin Gagon, Paul Oldham, David Pajo, and Peter Townsend.

Critical reception

I See a Darkness received widespread critical acclaim from music critics. Samir Khan of Pitchfork described the album as Oldham's "consummate offering" and the "type of record that demands solitary reverence". Gregg Rounds of AllMusic wrote that it showcased "a more melodic style than the veteran Palace listener might be used to", while at the same time noting that Oldham "hasn't abandoned his foundation of mordant lyrics and minimalist arrangements, but he has built a variety of different layers that make this album an emotional and pleasurable listening experience". The A.V. Club'''s Stephen Thompson remarked that I See a Darkness was the "most appropriate synthesis yet of Oldham's vocals and backing band". Simon Williams of NME was more reserved in his praise of the album, advising listeners that "patience is a virtue" while nonetheless calling it a "delicate, intelligent record".

LegacyI See a Darkness has been ranked in several publications' lists of best albums. Pitchfork ranked it the ninth best album of the 1990s. In 2004, Stylus Magazine placed I See a Darkness at number 171 on its list of the 200 best albums of all time, while in 2006, Mojo deemed it a "modern classic" and the twentieth best album released during the magazine's lifetime. The album was also included in the book 1001 Albums You Must Hear Before You Die.

In 2002, Matt LeMay of Stylus Magazine wrote that "by addressing concepts so grand with such sincerity and skill, the album is incredibly powerful under even the most mundane of circumstances". Reviewing its 2012 reissue, Aaron Lavery of Drowned in Sound called I See a Darkness Oldham's "finest achievement thus far" and the "essential release" in his discography. Q cited the album as "his masterpiece, ushering in a direct and less mythic style of songwriting".

Johnny Cash recorded the titular track on his 2000 album American III: Solitary Man, with Oldham providing background vocals. Steve Adey also covered the title track on his 2006 album All Things Real. Rosalía covered the song on her first album Los Ángeles'' in 2017.

Track listing

Personnel
Credits adapted from liner notes.

 Bob Arellano – music
 Colin Gagon – music, mixing
 Paul Oldham – music, recording
 Will Oldham – music
 Peter Townsend – music
 David Pajo – lead guitar (on "Song for the New Breed"), mixing
 Konrad Strauss – mastering
 Joanne Oldham – skull
 Joe Oldham – photography
 Sammy Harkham – drawing
 Len Small – layout

Charts

References

External links
 

1999 albums
Will Oldham albums
Domino Recording Company albums
Drag City (record label) albums